The Zu Mountain Saga was a 20-episode Hong Kong television drama series that aired on Television Broadcasts Limited (TVB) Cantonese-language Jade Channel between 22 July and 16 August 1991. Starring local actors, it was a loose sequel to The Gods and Demons of Zu Mountain that aired in 1990.

Synopsis 
The story take place a hundred years after The Gods and Demons of Zu Mountain.

Evil has been reborn in the Zu Mountain, who is ostracized by his village, as a demon. He meets Yu Ying Nam and Wo Mei Pai and from there they face many challenges that would question evil and good.

Cast 
Main Characters
 Adia Chan - Yu Ying Nan, the current eldest female disciple of the Zu Mountain Sect.
 Ekin Cheng - Shi Sheng, the present reincarnation of the Blood Demon.
 Law Lok Lam - the Supreme Wizard and the current leader of the demon sect.
 Lily Chung Shuk Wai - Cui Ying
 Jimmy Au - Sheng Tu Hong

Support Characters
 Lau Kong - A demonic scholar who tries to turn Shi Sheng to the dark side and use him for his own goals. Ironically, he was killed by Shi Sheng.
 Helena Law - Current leader of the Zu Mountain Sect and the mentor of Yu Ying Nan.
 Chan On Ying - Lai Guo
 Tsang Kong Sen - Sun Nan

Guest Star
 Eddie Kwan - Sheung Guan Ging Er, the Blood Demon from Episode 1 of The Gods and Demons of Zu Mountain

1991 Hong Kong television series debuts
1991 Hong Kong television series endings
1990s Hong Kong television series
Television shows set in Sichuan